Gavi Gangadhareshwara Temple also Gavipuram Cave Temple, an example of Indian rock-cut architecture, is located in Bangalore in the state of Karnataka in India. The temple is famous for its mysterious stone discs in the forecourt and the exact planning allowing the sun to shine on the shrine during certain time of the year. It was built in the 16th century by Kempe Gowda I, the founder of the city.

Temple
This cave temple dedicated to Shiva in Bengaluru is a well visited temple. Built by Gautama Maharshi and Bharadwaja Muni in Vedic period. Renovated in the 16th century AD by Kempe Gowda, the founder of Bengaluru, Temple Gavi Gangadhareshwara is an architectural marvel that attracts the faithful by the hordes. One of the oldest temples in Bengaluru, Gavi Gangadhareshwara temple was built by Kempe Gowda in recognition after being released from prison of five years by Rama Raya. There are other idols inside including idol of Agnimurthi having two heads, seven hands and three legs. Those who worship this deity believe it will cure one of the defects of the eye. The temple is also known for its four monolithic pillars, representing Damaru, Trishul and two fans on the patio.

Built in a natural cave in Gavipuram, the temple is dedicated to Lord Shiva and cut into a monolithic stone. The courtyard of the temple contains several monolithic sculptures. The main attractions of Gavi Gangadhareshvara temple are two granite pillars that support the giant disk of the sun and moon, and two pillars having several carvings of Nandi in a sitting posture at the top.

On the occasion of Makar Sankranti, the temple witnesses a unique phenomenon in the evening where sunlight passes through an arc between the horns of Nandi and falls directly on the linga inside the cave and illuminating the interior idol.

Two paintings dated 1 May 1792 AD by Thomas and William Daniell brothers shows that the temple has gone through some construction work with new walls and enclosures.

Deities inside the Temple
 Gavi Gangadhareswara
 Parvati Devi
 Vinayaka
 Subramanya
 Gautama Maharishi
 Bharadwaja Muni
 Chandikeswara
 Uma Maheswara
 Vallabha Ganapathi
 Durga Devi
 Agni Deva
 Sapthamatrikas
 Dakshinamurthy
 Kala Bhairava
 Veerabhadra
 Lakshmi Narayana
 Surya and Chandra
 Ayyappa
 Anjaneya
 Mahaganapati
 Subramanya with Valli and Devasena
 Navagrahas

Illumination of shrine by the Sun
Lakhs of devotees come in mid January every year on Makar sankranti day to this cave temple. This is a special day when the sun rays fall on the Shivalinga for one hour as it passes between the horns of the Nandi. Comparison of contemporary structures and earlier drawings by Thomas Daniell and William Daniell show that earlier the temple had fewer structures and the Sun illuminated the shrine in summer and winter solstice. Also today the Sun illuminates Shivalinga two times per year - from 13 to 16 January in late afternoons and from 26 November to 2 December.

Protected temple
The temple shrine is a protected monument under the Karnataka Ancient and Historical Monuments, and Archaeological Sites and Remains Act 1961.

Specialities
People believe that there is a tunnel which may lead to Kashi. However, it is believed that two men named Nishant and Prem went into the tunnel and never returned.

Nearby holy places 

 Gosaayi Math
Just behind the temple of Gavi Gangadhareshwara temple, there is a samadhi of a great yogi called Bet Narayan Maharaj.
 Sri Bande Mahakali Temple

Gallery

Vintage Gallery

See also
 Bhaja Caves
 Varaha Cave Temple
 Undavalli caves
 Badami Cave Temples
 Nellitheertha Cave Temple
 Pandavleni Caves
 Karla Caves
 Elephanta Caves
 Indian rock-cut architecture
 Hulimavu cave temple

Notes

Further reading

External links

 Gavi Gangadhareshwara - BangaloreTourism.org

Hindu cave temples in Karnataka
Hindu temples in Bangalore
Shiva temples in Karnataka
Archaeoastronomy